On February 22, 1972 a faction loyal to Ange Diawara attempted a coup against President Marien Ngouabi. Joachim Yhombi-Opango was instrumental in ending the coup. The musician Franklin Boukaka was killed in the coup, as was former Minister Élie Théophile Itsihou.  After more than a year of evading capture Diawara was ambushed and killed in April 1973 by forces loyal to Ngouabi.

References

Coup
Republic of the Congo
Military coups in the Republic of the Congo
1970s coups d'état and coup attempts
February 1972 events in Africa
Attempted coups d'état in the Republic of the Congo